Ira Ingram (August 19, 1788 – September 22, 1837)  was a soldier, legislator, and a land owner.  He was a member of Stephen F. Austin's Old Three Hundred. Ingram is also noted for being the Republic of Texas's first Speaker of the House.

Early life
Ira Ingram was born in Brookfield, Vermont, the son of Philip and Rachael (Burton) Ingram.  Ingram then lived in Tennessee, where he stayed until he moved to New Orleans, Louisiana.  In New Orleans, he married Emily B. Holt of Tennessee on March 13, 1823.  They had one daughter.  Emily Ingram died in October 1824.

Texas
In January 1826, Ingram and his brother Seth moved to the Austin's Colony at his brother's recommendation.  In 1828, they were partners in a merchandising establishment in San Felipe de Austin (presently known as San Felipe, Texas).  Ira ran for mayor (alcalde) of San Felipe de Austin but lost to Thomas M. Duke.  However, that year he represented the Mina District at the Convention of 1832 and San Felipe in the Convention of 1833.  The next year, he was elected the first alcalde of Matagorda.

The Texas Revolution broke out on October 2, 1835.  On December 22, 1835, Ingram wrote the Goliad Declaration of Independence.  Ingram also played a key role in the Texas Revolution. After the war, he was the first Speaker of the House for the Republic of Texas.  He served during the First Congress of the Republic of Texas (1836–37).

See also
List of Convention of 1832 delegates

References

Republic of Texas politicians
1st Congress of the Republic of Texas
1788 births
1837 deaths
Convention of 1832 delegates
People from Austin, Texas
People of the Texas Revolution
Members of the Texas House of Representatives
Speakers of the Republic of Texas House of Representatives
19th-century American politicians